John Bluthal (born Isaac Bluthal; 12 August 1929 – 15 November 2018) was a Polish-born Australian actor and comedian, noted for his six-decade career internationally in Australia, the United Kingdom and the United States. He started his career during the Golden Age of British Television, where he was best known for his comedy work in the UK with Spike Milligan, and for his role as Manny Cohen in the television series Never Mind the Quality, Feel the Width. In later years, he was known to television audiences as the bumbling Frank Pickle in The Vicar of Dibley. At 85 he played Professor Herbert Marcuse in the Coen brothers' film Hail, Caesar! (2016).

Early life
Bluthal was born to a Jewish family in Jezierzany, Galicia, Poland (now in Ukraine). Due to anti-Semitism in Poland, his family emigrated to Melbourne, Australia, in 1938, when he was aged nine. He was educated at Princes Hill Central School in Carlton North and University High School in Parkville. He began his acting career in Melbourne's Yiddish Theatre and subsequently studied drama at the University of Melbourne. In 1949, he travelled to Europe and the United Kingdom, during which time he appeared in pantomime. He worked in repertory theatre in Melbourne and appeared in Australian radio dramas, as well as television productions including Shell Presents and Three's A Crowd. He also devised and produced Gaslight Music Hall, in which he starred.

Career
Bluthal moved to the United Kingdom permanently in 1960 and appeared in Citizen James in 1960 for BBC television, and the long-running ITV comedy series Never Mind the Quality, Feel the Width (1967–71) in which he played Manny Cohen, a Jewish London tailor in business with an Irish Catholic tailor, Patrick Kelly, played by Joe Lynch. Also in the 1960s, he provided the voice for Commander Zero in the television Supermarionation series Fireball XL5 (1962–63).

Bluthal had worked with Spike Milligan before leaving Australia, appearing with him in a 1958 Australian television special, The Gladys Half-Hour, in the Australian radio comedy series The Idiot Weekly. On relocating to Britain, he appeared as several characters in Milligan and John Antrobus' stage play The Bedsitting Room, which opened at the Mermaid Theatre on 31 January 1963. He also appeared in The Omar Khayyam Show, a UK remake of episodes from The Idiot Weekly. He later worked extensively with Milligan on the television series Q and its radio counterpart The Milligan Show. Bluthal was able to produce many comedic and imitative voices, like Milligan's radio colleague Peter Sellers, and he was used somewhat like Sellers in Milligan's later work.

Bluthal worked extensively in British theatre. In 1960 he played Fagin in the original production of the musical Oliver! in the West End (replacing Ron Moody). His appearances at the National Theatre included Tales from Hollywood, Entertaining Strangers, Peter Hall's production of Antony and Cleopatra (with Judi Dench and Anthony Hopkins), Yonaadab, The Tempest, The Winter's Tale, and Cymbeline.

His other television appearances include the Sykes and a... episode "Sykes and a Bath", broadcast on 25 January 1961, Hancock ("The Radio Ham", 1961), The Avengers (1965), The Saint ("The Happy Suicide", 1965), 'Allo 'Allo! (1984), Minder (1985), Bergerac (1990), One Foot in the Grave (1990), Rumpole of the Bailey (1991), Inspector Morse (1993), Lovejoy (1994), Last of the Summer Wine (1995), and Jonathan Creek (1997), as well as appearing as Major Cheeseburger in The Goodies' episode "Clown Virus". He also replaced Ronnie Stevens in the Australian comedy/satire series The Mavis Bramston Show for the second half of 1966 and starred as "Enzo Pacelli" in the ABC-TV comedy television series Home Sweet Home (1982-3). Bluthal also appeared as Leonid Krasin in episodes of the Thames TV series Reilly, Ace of Spies (1983). and "Chalky", a hospital patient, in the episode "I Gotta Horse" of the comedy television series Doctor Down Under (1979) the Australian series of the British television series syndicated internationally as Doctor in the House, which also starred Robin Nedwell as Dr. Duncan Waring and Geoffrey Davies as Dr. Dick Stuart-Clark).

His films appearances include: The Knack ...and How to Get It (1965), three Carry On films, two of the Doctor films, and also The Beatles' films A Hard Day's Night (1964) and Help! (1965), three roles in Casino Royale (1967), and two of the Pink Panther films.  Bluthal also played several characters in The Great McGonagall (1974), by Spike Milligan and Joseph McGrath, based on the life of William McGonagall. He portrayed an Egyptologist in the year 1914 for the first part of the film The Fifth Element (1997) and Uncle Karl in Dark City (1998). He also appeared in the comedy Beware of Greeks Bearing Guns (2000).

His later television appearances have been in the sitcom The Vicar of Dibley as the fastidious minutes-taker Frank Pickle and as the caretaker Rocko in Spirited.

He also appeared in the 2004 film Love's Brother and in the 2016 Coen brothers film Hail, Caesar!

His final appearance was with his daughter Lisa Bluthal in her 2018 short film By Any Other Name, a comedy about a daughter dealing with her father's Alzheimer's.

Personal life and death
Bluthal married actress Judyth Barron in 1956. Together they had daughters Nava and Lisa, but later separated. Barron died in 2016.

Bluthal's agent confirmed on 16 November 2018 that the actor had died, aged 89, in New South Wales, Australia. Following his death, fellow The Vicar of Dibley actor Dawn French said "Tons of happy laughs remembered today. Cheeky, naughty, hilarious. Bye darlin' Bluey." On 22 December 2018, BBC One aired The Vicar of Dibley'''s December 1996 episode "The Christmas Lunch Incident" with a caption at the end remembering Bluthal's death. Similarly the final episode of the lockdown edition of The Vicar of Dibley'' ended with a tribute just before the closing credits reading, "In loving memory of Liz, John, Emma and Roger", paying tribute to him and also three other deceased Dibley cast members  (Liz Smith, Emma Chambers and Roger Lloyd-Pack).

Bluthal's sister Nita married Stephen Murray-Smith, making Joanna Murray-Smith his niece.

Filmography

Film

TV series

References

External links

John Bluthal at Filmreference
John Bluthal at BBC Comedy Guide

1929 births
2018 deaths
Australian emigrants to England
Australian people of Polish-Jewish descent
British male film actors
British male radio actors
British male stage actors
British male television actors
British male voice actors
British people of Polish-Jewish descent
Jewish Australian male actors
Jewish British male actors
People from Ternopil Oblast
Polish emigrants to Australia
Polish emigrants to the United Kingdom
University of Melbourne alumni
20th-century British male actors
21st-century British male actors